Puccinia verruca is a plant pathogen that causes rust on safflower.

See also
 List of Puccinia species

References

External links
 USDA ARS Fungal Database

Fungal plant pathogens and diseases
verruca
Fungi described in 1879